Timeline showing the development of the extinct reptilian order Pterosauria from its appearance in the late Triassic period to its demise at the end of the Cretaceous, together with an alphabetical listing of pterosaur species and their geological ages.

Timeline

Data
 Angustinarhipterus longicephalus: Bathonian-Callovian
 Anhanguera blittersdorffi: Aptian-Albian
 Anhanguera cuvieri: Albian
 Anhanguera cuvieri: Cenomanian-Turonian
 Anhanguera cuvieri: Late Albian
 Anhanguera fittoni: late Albian
 Anhanguera santanae: Aptian-Albian
 Anurognathus ammoni: Tithonian
 Aralazhdarcho bostobensis: Santonian-early Campanian
 Arambourgiania philadelphiae: Maastrichtian
 Arcticodactylus cromptonellus: Norian–Rhaetian
 Arthurdactylus conandoylei: Late Aptian-early Albian
 Austriadactylus cristatus: Middle to late Norian
 Azhdarcho sp.: Early Santonian
 Azhdarcho lancicollis: Middle-late Turonian
 Bakonydraco galaczi: Santonian
 Batrachognathus volans: Oxfordian-Kimmeridgian
 Beipiaopterus chenianus: Late Barremian – early Aptian 
 Boreopterus cuiae: late Barremian – early Aptian 
 Brasileodactylus araripensis: Aptian-Albian
 Cacibupteryx caribensis: Middle-late Oxfordian
 Cathayopterus grabaui: late Barremian – early Aptian 
 Campylognathoides sp.: Early Toarcian
 Campylognathoides indicus: Pliensbachian-Toarcian
 Campylognathoides liasicus: Early Toarcian
 Campylognathoides zitteli: Early Toarcian
 Caulkicephalus trimicrodon: Barremian
 Caviramus schesaplanensis: Late Norian or early Rhaetian
 Cearadactylus atrox: Aptian-Albian
 Chaoyangopterus zhangi: Aptian
 Coloborhynchus clavirostris: Late Berriasian – Valanginian 
 Coloborhynchus moroccensis:  Early Cenomanian
 cf. Coloborhynchus sp: Late Cenomanian
 Coloborhynchus robustus:  Aptian-Albian
 Coloborhynchus sedgwickii: Late Albian
 Coloborhynchus spielburgi: Aptian-Albian
 Coloborhynchus wadleighi: Late Albian
 Ctenochasma elegens:  Tithonian 
 Ctenochasma roemeri: Berriasian
 Ctenochasma taqueti: Early Tithonian
 Cycnorhamphus canjuersensis: Early Tithonian
 Cycnorhamphus suevicus: Late Kimmeridgian
 Cycnorhamphus suevicus: Tithonian
 Dendrorhynchoides curvidentatus: Late Barremian – early Aptian 
 Dimorphodon macronyx: Late Sinemurian
 Dimorphodon weintraubi:  Early Middle Jurassic
 Domeykodactylus ceciliae: Lower Cretaceous
 Dorygnathus cf. D. banthensis: Early Toarcian
 Dorygnathus banthensis: Early Toarcian
 Dorygnathus mistelgauensis: Early Toarcian
 Dsungaripterus weii: ?Valanginian-Albian 
 Eosipterus yangi:  late Barremian – early Aptian 
 Eudimorphodon cf. E. ranzii: Middle to late Norian
 Eudimorphodon ranzii: Late Norian
 Eudimorphodon rosenfeldi: Late Norian
 Eudimorphodon sp.: Late Carnian
 Feilongus youngi: late Barremian – early Aptian 
 Gegepterus changi: late Barremian – early Aptian 
 Germanodactylus: Kimmeridgian
 Germanodactylus cristatus: Tithonian
 Germanodactylus rhamphastinus: Tithonian
 Gnathosaurus macrurus: Berriasian
 Gnathosaurus subulatus: Tithonian
 Haopterus gracilis: late Barremian – early Aptian
 Hatzegopteryx thambema: Late Maastrichtian
 Herbstosaurus pigmaeus:  Middle-late Tithonian
 Huanhepterus quingyangensis: Late Jurassic
 Huaxipterus benxiensis: Aptian
 Huaxipterus corollatus: Aptian
 Istiodactylus latidens: Barremian
 Istiodactylus sinensis: Aptian
 Jeholopterus ningchengensis: Bathonian-Callovian
 Jidapterus edentus: Aptian
 Kepodactylus insperatus: Kimmeridgian-Tithonian
 Liaoningopterus gui: Aptian
 Liaoxipterus brachyognathus: Aptian
 Lonchodectes compressirostris: Cenomanian-Turonian
 Lonchodectes compressirostris: Late Albian
 Lonchodectes giganteus: Cenomanian-Turonian
 Lonchodectes microdon: Late Albian
 Lonchodectes platystomus: Albian
 Lonchodectes platystomus: Late Albian
 Lonchodectes sagittirostris: Late Berriasian – Valanginian 
 Lonchognathosaurus acutirostris:  ?Aptian-Albian
 Ludodactylus sibbicki:  Late Aptian-early Albian
 Mesadactylus ornithosphyos: Kimmeridgian-Tithonian 
 Montanazhdarcho minor: Middle-late Campanian
 Muzquizopterix coahuilensis: Early Coniacian
 Nemicolopterus crypticus: Aptian
 Nesodactylus hesperius: Middle-late Oxfordian
 Noripterus complicidens: ?Valanginian-Albian
 Normannognathus wellnhoferi: Late Kimmeridgian
 Nurhachius ignaciobritoi: Aptian
 Nyctosaurus gracilis: Late Santonian-early Campanian
 Nyctosaurus lamegoi: Maastrichtian
 Nyctosaurus nanus: Late Coniacian-early Santonian
 Ornithocheirus sp.: Albian
  cf. Ornithocheirus sp.: Early Barremian
 Ornithocheirus sp.: Early Cenomanian
 Ornithocheirus mesembrinus: Aptian-Albian
 Ornithocheirus simus: Late Albian
 Ornithostoma sedgwicki: Late Albian
 Parapsicephalus purdoni Early Toarcian
 Peteinosaurus zambelli: Late Norian
 Phosphatodraco mauritanicus: Maastrichtian
 Plataleorhynchus streptorophodon: Berriasian
 Preondactylus buffarinii: Late Norian
 Pteranodon sternbergi: Late Coniacian-early Santonian
 Pteranodon longiceps: Late Santonian-early Campanian
 Pteranodon longiceps: Early Campanian
 Pterodactylus antiquus: Tithonian
 Pterodactylus longicollum: Late Kimmeridgian
 Pterodactylus longicollum:  Tithonian
 Pterodactylus micronyx: Tithonian
 Pterodaustro guinazui: Aptian
 Pterodaustro guinazui: Albian
 Pterorhynchus wellnhoferi: Bathonian-Callovian
 Quetzalcoatlus: Late Maastrichtian
 Quetzalcoatlus northropi: Late Maastrichtian
 Rhamphinion jenkinsi: Sinemurian-Pliensbachian
 Rhamphocephalus sp. Early Bathonian
 Rhamphocephalus sp.: Middle Bathonian
 Rhamphocephalus bucklandi: Early Bathonian
 Rhamphocephalus bucklandi: Middle Bathonian
 Rhamphocephalus sp.: Late Bathonian
 Rhamphorhynchus sp.: Late Callovian
 Rhamphorhynchus muensteri: Late Kimmeridgian
 Rhamphorhynchus muensteri: Tithonian
 Scaphognathus crassirostris: Tithonian
 Sinopterus dongi: Aptian
 Sinopterus gui: Aptian
 Sordes pilosus: Oxfordian-Kimmeridgian
 Tapejara wellnhoferi: Aptian-Albian
 Tendaguripterus recki:  : Late Kimmeridgian-Tithonian  
 Thalassodromeus sethi: Aptian-Albian
 Tupundactylus imperator: Late Aptian-early Albian
 Tupundactylus navigans:  late Aptian-early Albian
 Tupuxaura leonardi: Aptian-Albian
 Tupuxuara longicristatus: Aptian-Albian
 Zhejiangopterus linhaiensis: Early Campanian

See also
List of pterosaur genera
Phylogeny of pterosaurs

References
 Barrett PM, Butler RJ, Edwards NP, Milner AR. Pterosaur distribution in time and space: an atlas. Zitteliana. 2008:61–107.

Pterosaurs
Paleontology timelines